Leon Johannes de Villiers (born 25 June 1960, Pretoria) is an Afrikaans author of children's and youth stories. During his career he has been awarded the Scheepers Prize, the MER Prize, the Alba Bouwer Prize, the CP Hoogenhout Prize and the ATKV Children's Book Award. His youth novel, Die Pro (The Pro), was adapted and released in 2015 as a film.

Works

References 

1960 births
Living people
South African children's writers
People from Pretoria